Morse is a surname of Flemish origin from old Frisian, and may refer to:

People
 Alan Morse (born 1958), American guitarist
 Albert Pitts Morse (1863–1936), American entomologist
 Alex Morse (born 1989), American politician
 Alice Cordelia Morse (1863–1961), American book designer
 Alina Morse (born 2005), American teenage businessperson
 Allen B. Morse (1837–1921), American jurist
 Alpheus C. Morse (1818–1893), American architect
 Andrew Morse (born 1974), American television news executive
 Andy Morse (born 1958), American professional golfer
 Anson D. Morse (1846–1916), American educator and historian
 Anthony Morse (1911–1984), American mathematician
 Sir Arthur Morse (1892–1967), British banker
 Arthur D. Morse (1920–1971), American historian
 Barry Morse (1918–2008), British-Canadian actor
 Bessie Morse (1869–1948), American educator
 Bobby Morse (born 1965), American football running back
 Bree Morse (born 1991), American beauty pageant titleholder
 Brett Morse (born 1989), British discus thrower
 Bryan Morse (1885–1939), American college football, basketball and track coach
 Bud Morse (1904–1987), American baseball second baseman and attorney
 Butch Morse (1910–1995), American football end
 Carlton E. Morse (1901–1993), American radio producer
 Cathy Morse (born 1955), American professional golfer
 Cecilia Morse (1838–1926), American educator and citrus farmer
 Charles Morse (disambiguation), several people
 Christine Morse (born 1973), American politician
 Christopher Morse (born 1935), American theologian
 Chuck Morse, President of the New Hampshire Senate
 Chuck Morse (journalist) (born 1972), American journalist
 Chuck W. Morse (born 1969), American anarchist
 Colin Morse (born 1955), Australian rules footballer
 Dan Morse, American archaeologist
 David Morse (disambiguation), several people
 Derrick Morse (born 1985), American football player
 Ed Morse, American politician
 Edward Morse (disambiguation), several people
 Elijah A. Morse (1841–1898), American politician
 Elizabeth Eaton Morse (1864–1955), American mycologist
 Ella Mae Morse (1924–1999), American singer
 Elmer Morse (disambiguation), several people
 Emerante Morse (1918–2018), Haitian singer, dancer and folklorist
 Emily Morse (born 1970), American sex therapist, author, and media personality
 Ephraim Morse (1823–1906), American settler of San Diego
 Eric W. Morse (1904–1986), author and historian
 Erik Morse (born 1979), journalist and rock writer
 Eugene Morse, American internal auditor and whistleblower
 F. Bradford Morse (1921–1994), American politician
 Francis Morse (1818–1886), Church of England priest
 Frank Morse (disambiguation), several people
 Franklin Morse (1873–1929), football player and journalist
 Freeman H. Morse (1807–1891), American politician
 Fuzzbee Morse, American composer, performer, and music producer
 Garry Thomas Morse, Canadian poet and novelist
 George Morse (disambiguation), several people
 Godfrey Morse (1846–1911), German-American lawyer
 H. Gary Morse (1936–2014), American billionaire
 Hap Morse (1886–1974), American baseball shortstop
 Harmon Northrop Morse (1848–1920), US American chemist
 Harold Morse (1860–?), English international footballer
 Harry N. Morse (1835–1912), ("bloodhound of the far west"), an Old West lawman
 Hayward Morse (born 1947), British actor
 Helen Morse (born 1947), Australian actress
 Henry G. Morse (1884–1934), American architect
 Hiram D. Morse (1815–?), American politician
 Horace J. Morse (1838–1930), Adjutant General of the State of Connecticut and businessman
 Hosea Ballou Morse (1855–1934), Canadian-born American British customs official and historian of China
 Saint Henry Morse (1595–1645), English priest
 Isaac Edward Morse (1809–1866), American politician
 James Morse, British Royal Navy officer
 James Shannon Morse (1783–1881), Canadian lawyer and politician
 Jedidiah Morse (1761–1826), American clergyman and geographer, father of Samuel Morse
 Jennifer Morse (disambiguation), several people
 Sir Jeremy Morse (1928–2016), British educator
 Jo Morse (born 1932), American bridge player
 John Morse (disambiguation), several people
 Joshua Morse, American professor
 Josiah Mitchell Morse (1912–2004), American writer
 Karen Morse (water skier), British water skier
 Karen W. Morse, American chemist
 Ken Morse (born 1949), British cameraman
 Kenneth Morse (born 1946), American businessman
 Laila Morse (born 1945), British actress
 Lee Morse (1897–1954), American singer
 Leopold Morse (1831–1892), American politician
 Luis C. Morse (born 1940), American politician
 Macy Morse (1921–2019), American activist
 Marston Morse (1892–1977), American mathematician
 Mike Morse (born 1982), American baseball player
 Neal Morse (born 1960), American musician
 Nicholas Morse (died 1772), British president of Madras
 Oliver A. Morse (1815–1870), American politician
 Philip M. Morse (1903–1985), American physicist
 Ralph Morse (1917–2014), American photographer
 Rebecca Morse (disambiguation), several people
 Reynolds and Eleanor Morse, a husband and wife team of American industrialists and philanthropists
 Richard Auguste Morse (born 1957), Haitian-American musician
 Richard McGee Morse (1922–2001), American Latin-American scholar
 Robert Morse (1931–2022), American actor
 Roger Morse (1927–2000), American biologist
 Samuel Morse (1791–1872), American inventor and painter; invented the Morse code system
 Scott Morse, American animator
 Sidney Edwards Morse (1794–1871), American inventor
 Stanford Morse (1926–2002), American politician
 Stephen Morse (designer), engineer
 Steven Morse (disambiguation), several people
 Theodora Morse (1890–1953), American lyricist
 Theodore F. Morse (1873–1924), American composer
 Tim Morse, interim CEO at Yahoo!
 Toby Morse (born 1970), American singer
 Todd Morse, American guitarist
 Wayne Morse (1900–1974), American politician
 Wesley Morse (1897–1963), American cartoonist

See also
 Morse (disambiguation)
 Justice Morse (disambiguation)